Astrid Coppens (born 25 January 1983) is a Flemish Belgian model, actress, television personality, creative director.

Career

Music
Astrid is a trained classical violinist. She started playing in 1987 at the age of 4, and subsequently appeared on various television shows and concert podia until 1998.

In 2008, Astrid launched a singing career with the song "You Know I Would" which she co-wrote and composed. The song was included on the soundtrack of the film The Pool Boys. Astrid's debut album as a singer, 'Taking Over', was released in 2009.

Model

Astrid signed with Dominique Models in Belgium and Next Models USA

Reality TV
In 2011, Astrid  began starring in her own reality show called Astrid in Wonderland that aired for five seasons. The show first aired on September second 2011 on VijfTV. In 2012, Astrid in Wonderland got picked up in the Netherlands and is shown on the Dutch channel NET 5.
In 2016 Astrid started filming on her new TV series "Astrid" that aired on VijfTV February 2017.

Filmography

Film

 2017: Verborgen Verlangen as Louise Elsschot
 2016: Broken Vows as Justine
 2014: The Loft as Uninterested Girl
 2012: The Bold and the Beautiful as Marie (Episode #6.312)
 2011: The Pool Boys as Bachelorette Party Guest (uncredited)

Television

 2016–2017: Astrid
 2011–2013: Astrid in Wonderland
 2011: Me Time
 2011: Nederlandse Hollywood Vrouwen
 2010: Vlaamse Hollywood Vrouwen

Bibliography

 Amazing Astrid October 2012. Her book became a bestseller.
 Stylish Astrid December 2013.

Fashion
She launched her own clothing and shoe line in May 2012. The entire collection sold out in less than two hours.

In June 2012, Astrid  also launched her own fragrance, called Astrid in Wonderland, followed in October 2012 by her own nail polish by OPI Products. This makes her the first European celebrity to have an OPI line.

In September 2013 she became creative director of  her own clothing line Astrid Black Label. It is currently sold in eighty stores in Belgium at the fashion chain ZEB.

Personal life

Astrid married director Bram Coppens on 6 December 2016 on the island of Turks and Caicos. Previously she was married to John Bryan.
She gave birth in Belgium to a daughter Billie-Ray on 28 June 2019.

References

External links 

 
 
 

Living people
1983 births
Belgian women singer-songwriters
Belgian female models
21st-century Belgian women singers
21st-century Belgian singers